Ryan Sean Buckley (born 2 April 1994 in Darlington, County Durham) is an English cricketer who most recently played for Durham County Cricket Club. He is a right-arm off break bowler who also bats right handed. He made his first-class debut for the county in May 2013 against Surrey, taking 5/86.

References

External links
 
 

1994 births
Living people
English cricketers
Durham cricketers
Sportspeople from Darlington
Cricketers from County Durham
Northumberland cricketers